The NME Tours consist of a variety of tours organised by British music industry publication NME. Throughout the year, NME sponsors numerous tours of the United Kingdom by various up-and-coming and established bands in a variety of formats. The tours are titled to reflect the genre and type of bands playing on them.

ShockWaves NME Awards Tours

The ShockWaves NME Awards Tours (known without sponsorship as the ''NME Awards Tour before 1999, and the Brat Bus Tour before 1998) normally takes place in the lead up to the official NME Awards themselves. The tour has been known to sell out in just a matter of hours. The tour normally showcasts the main protagonists of the independent alternative rock scene, with a number of relatively unheard of bands usually supporting more mainstream acts. A number of previous support acts on the tour have gone on to become very successful commercially, such as Arctic Monkeys (support act in 2006) and Franz Ferdinand (who played the opening slot in 2004). Since 2005, the tour has been sponsored by unisex hair product company ShockWaves.

In 2007, the main NME Awards tour was split into two different tours of four bands each. The first tour, the ShockWaves NME Indie Rock Tour was created to reflect the growing indie rock scene in Britain throughout 2006-2007. The second tour, the ShockWaves NME Indie Rave Tour, displays the small number of bands currently associated with the new rave music genre. NME editor Conor McNicholas stated that the reason for the tour split was to allow more fans to gain tickets to the Awards tour, and allow them to display more bands at the one time. The tours were played in a number of intertwined dates at the same time. This format was kept for one year, before reverting to one tour in 2008. In 2017, rather than organise a tour themselves, NME sponsored a series of previously announced headline dates by the band Blossoms. In 2018, for the first time in 23 years, an NME sponsored tour did not take place. Though NME are yet to make a statement about the cancellation of the tour, they have run articles about the demise of the Warped Tour on their website.  
2017: Blossoms, Cabbage, Rory Wynne
2016: Bloc Party, Drenge, Ratboy, Bugzy Malone
2015: Palma Violets, Fat White Family, Slaves, The Wytches
2014: Interpol, Temples, Royal Blood, Circa Waves
2013: Django Django, Miles Kane, Palma Violets, Peace
2012: Two Door Cinema Club, Metronomy, Tribes, Azealia Banks
2011: Crystal Castles, Magnetic Man, Everything Everything, The Vaccines
2010: The Maccabees, Bombay Bicycle Club, The Big Pink, The Drums
2009: Glasvegas, Friendly Fires, White Lies, Florence and the Machine
2008: The Cribs, Joe Lean and the Jing Jang Jong, Does It Offend You, Yeah?, The Ting Tings
2007:
ShockWaves NME Indie Rock Tour: The Automatic, The View, The Horrors, Mumm-Ra
ShockWaves NME Indie Rave Tour: Klaxons, CSS, The Sunshine Underground, New Young Pony Club
2006: Maxïmo Park, Arctic Monkeys, We Are Scientists, Mystery Jets	
2005: The Killers, The Futureheads, Bloc Party, Kaiser Chiefs
2004: Funeral for a Friend, The Rapture, The Von Bondies, Franz Ferdinand
2003: The Datsuns, The Polyphonic Spree, Interpol, The Thrills
2002: Andrew W.K., Lostprophets, Black Rebel Motorcycle Club, The Coral
2001: Amen, JJ72, Alfie, Starsailor
2000: Shack, Les Rythmes Digitales, Campag Velocet, Coldplay
1999: UNKLE, Idlewild, Delakota, Llama Farmers
1998: Stereophonics, Asian Dub Foundation, The Warm Jets, Theaudience
1997: Geneva, Symposium, Tiger, Three Colours Red
1996: The Bluetones, The Cardigans, Heavy Stereo, Fluffy
1995: Veruca Salt, Marion, Skunk Anansie, 60 Ft. Dolls

NME Radar Tour
The NME Radar Tour (formerly known as the Topman NME New Noise Tour in 2008, and the Topman NME New Music Tour before 2008) has taken place in venues throughout the United Kingdom since 2005. The tour is played by relatively unknown bands to gain them more mainstream exposure. In 2009, a second "Autumn Radar Tour" took place during September and October. In 2014, the event was rebranded the NME New Breed Tour; NME and headliners Superfood handpicked a different support act for each night of the tour. The tour did not return in 2015.

2014: Superfood, Honeyblood
2013: Cerebral Ballzy, The Amazing Snakeheads, The Bohicas, Fat White Family
2012: Howler, The Cast of Cheers, Gross Magic
2011 (Spring): Anna Calvi, Grouplove, Big Deal, The History of Apple Pie
2010 (Autumn): The Joy Formidable, Chapel Club, Flats, Wilder
2010: Hurts, Everything Everything, Darwin Deez
2009 Autumn Radar Tour: Golden Silvers, Marina and the Diamonds, Local Natives, Yes Giantess
2009: La Roux, Magistrates, Heartbreak, The Chapman Family
2008: Crystal Castles, Friendly Fires, Team Waterpolo, White Lies
2007: The Rumble Strips, The Little Ones, Pull Tiger Tail, Blood Red Shoes
2006: Boy Kill Boy, The Automatic, ¡Forward, Russia!, The Long Blondes
2005: Maxïmo Park, Nine Black Alps, Boy Kill Boy, The Checks, The Cribs, Battle, The Rakes, Towers of London, The Vega Method

O2/NME Rock 'N' Roll Riot Tour

The NME Rock 'n' Roll Riot Tour (sponsored by O2) started in 2003. The tour usually takes place later in the year compared to the main awards tours, taking place in September–October of each year. Some of the bands have even gone on to play in other NME Tours; The Horrors, following their support slot on the 2006 Riot Tour, would later play on the 2007 NME Awards Indie Rock Tour.
2008: Primal Scream, RTX1, Cristine
2007: The Enemy, Lethal Bizzle, The Wombats
2006: The Fratellis, The Maccabees, The Horrors, The Dykeenies, Sohodolls
2005: Kaiser Chiefs, Maxïmo Park, The Cribs
2004: Razorlight, The Duke Spirit, Dogs
2003: Jet, The Hiss, Mr. David Viner, Miss S. Payne
1Support for the tour was confirmed by Fused Magazine. Official support acts were never announced by NME.

NME Rock 'N' Roll Riot Tour (United States)
On 20 August 2007, NME announced they would be adding a further Rock 'n' Roll Tour, this time as a tour of the US. The inaugural tour features mainly bands from areas of the US, such as New York City, Brooklyn and Los Angeles.
2007: The Hold Steady, Art Brut, Demander, Federale, The Blood Arm, 1990s

NME Freshers Tour
The NME Freshers Tour is taking place around "Freshers week", the week in which Universities in the UK begin their first academic term. 2007 marks the debut of this tour.
2007: The Go! Team, Operator Please, The Satin Peaches

NME New Rave Revolution Tour
The NME'' New Rave Revolution Tour was a tour that took place throughout September to October 2006. The line-up consisted of bands who were closely related to the "new rave" music scene which appeared throughout 2006. Klaxons would go on to headline the Indie Rave leg of the NME Awards Tour in February 2007

It is unknown whether or not another New Rave Revolution Tour will take place, due to the small number of bands and the short-lived nature of the genre.
2006: Klaxons, SHITDISCO, Datarock

References

External links

Lists of concert tours
Tours